Arunachal Pradesh is a state in Northeastern India. It was formed from the erstwhile North-East Frontier Agency (NEFA) region, and became a state on 20 February 1987.  Itanagar is the state capital.

Arunachal Pradesh is the largest of the Seven Sister States of Northeast India by area. It borders the states of Assam and Nagaland to the south. It shares international borders with Bhutan in the west, Myanmar in the east, and a disputed 1,129 km border with China's Tibet Autonomous Region in the north at the McMahon Line.

It is an ethnically diverse state, with predominantly Monpa people in the west, Tani people in the centre, Mishmi and Tai people in the east, and Naga people in the southeast of the state. About 26 major tribes and 100 sub-tribes live in the state, including Adi, Nyshi, Singpho, Galo, Tagin and Apatani. The Mishmi tribe has three sub-tribes, namely Idu-Mishmi, Digaru-Mishmi and Miju-Mishmi.

A major part of the state is claimed by both the People's Republic of China and the Republic of China as part of the region of “South Tibet”. The People's Liberation Army briefly occupied parts of the state in 1962.

Toponymy
Arunachal Pradesh means Land of the Dawn-Lit Mountains, which is the sobriquet for the state in Sanskrit.

History

Ancient and Medieval period
Northwestern parts of this area came under the control of the Monpa kingdom of Monyul, which flourished between 500 BCE and 600 CE. The Monpa and Sherdukpen keep historical records of the existence of local chiefdoms in the northwest as well. The remaining parts of the state, especially the foothills and the plains, were under the control of the Chutia kings of Assam.

Recent excavations of ruins of Hindu temples, such as the 14th-century Malinithan at the foot of the Siang hills in West Siang, indicate they were built during the Chutia reign. Another notable heritage site, Bhismaknagar (built in the 8th century), has led to suggestions that the Chutia people had an advanced culture and administration. The third heritage site, the 400-year-old Tawang Monastery in the extreme north-west of the state, provides some historical evidence of the Buddhist tribal people. The sixth Dalai Lama Tsangyang Gyatso was born in Tawang.

The main archaeological sites of the state include:

British India

In 1912–13, the British Indian government made agreements with the indigenous peoples of the Himalayas of northeastern India to establish the North-East Frontier Tracts. It was divided into three sections, which eventually came to be called the Ballipara Frontier Tract, Lakhimpur Frontier Tract and Sadiya Frontier Tract.

The McMahon line 

In 1913–1914, representatives of the de facto independent state of Tibet and Britain met in India to define the borders of 'Outer Tibet' (with respect to China). British administrator Sir Henry McMahon drew the  McMahon Line as the border between British India and Tibet, placing Tawang and other areas within British India. The Tibetan and British representatives devised the Simla Accord including the McMahon Line, but the Chinese representatives did not concur. The Simla Accord denies other benefits to China while it declines to assent to the Accord.

The Chinese position was that Tibet was not independent from China and could not sign treaties, so the Accord was invalid, like the Anglo-Chinese (1906) and Anglo-Russian (1907) conventions. British records show that the condition for the Tibetan government to accept the new border was that China must accept the Simla Convention. As Britain was not able to get an acceptance from China, Tibetans considered the MacMahon line invalid.

In the time that China did not exercise power in Tibet, the line had no serious challenges. In 1935, a Deputy Secretary in the Foreign Department, Olaf Caroe, "discovered" that the McMahon Line was not drawn on official maps. The Survey of India published a map showing the McMahon Line as the official boundary in 1937. In 1938, two decades after the Simla Conference, the British finally published the Simla Accord as a bilateral accord and the Survey of India published a detailed map showing the McMahon Line as a border of India. In 1944, Britain established administrations in the area, from Dirang Dzong in the west to Walong in the east.

Sino-Indian War 

India became independent in 1947 and the People's Republic of China (PRC) was established in 1949. The new Chinese government still considered the McMahon Line invalid. In November 1950, the PRC was poised to take over Tibet by force, and India supported Tibet. Journalist Sudha Ramachandran argued that China claimed Tawang on behalf of Tibetans, though Tibetans did not claim Tawang is in Tibet.

What is now Arunachal Pradesh was established as the North-East Frontier Agency (NEFA) in 1954 and Sino-Indian relations were cordial until 1960. Resurgence of the border disagreement was a factor leading to the Sino-Indian War in 1962, during which China captured most of Arunachal Pradesh. During the 1962 Sino-Indian War, most of Arunachal Pradesh was captured and temporarily controlled by the Chinese People's Liberation Army. However, China soon declared victory, withdrew back to the McMahon Line and returned Indian prisoners of war in 1963.

The war resulted in the termination of barter trade with Tibet, although since 2007 the Indian government has shown signs of wanting to resume barter trade.

Renaming and statehood
The North-East Frontier Agency was renamed Arunachal Pradesh by Bibhabasu Das Shastri, the Director of Research and K.A.A. Raja, the Chief Commissioner of Arunachal Pradesh on 20 January 1972, and it became a union territory. Arunachal Pradesh became a state on 20 February 1987.

Recent assertions 

In January 2007, the Dalai Lama said that both Britain and Tibet had recognised the McMahon Line in 1914. In 2008, he said that "Arunchal Pradesh was a part of India under the agreement signed by Tibetan and British representatives". According to the Dalai Lama, "In 1962 during the India-China war, the People's Liberation Army (PLA) occupied all these areas (Arunachal Pradesh) but they announced a unilateral ceasefire and withdrew, accepting the current international boundary".

In recent years, China has occasionally asserted its claims on Tawang. India has rebutted these claims and informed the Chinese government that Tawang is an integral part of India. India reiterated this to China when the two prime ministers met in Thailand in October 2009. A report that the Chinese Army had briefly invaded Arunachal Pradesh in 2016 was denied by India's Minister of State for Home Affairs, Kiren Rijiju. In April 2017, China strongly objected to a visit to Tawang by the Dalai Lama, as it had to an earlier visit by the US ambassador to India. China had objected to the Dalai Lama's previous visits to the area.

Insurgency 

Arunachal Pradesh has faced threats from insurgent groups, notably the National Socialist Council of Nagaland (NSCN), who are believed to have base camps in the districts of Changlang and Tirap. These groups seek to decrease the influence of Indian government in the region and merge part of Arunachal Pradesh into Nagaland.

The Indian army is present along the Tibetan border to thwart any Chinese incursion. Under the Foreigners (Protected Areas) Order 1958 (India), Inner Line Permits (ILPs) are required to enter Arunachal Pradesh through any of its checkgates on the border with Assam.

Politics

Arunachal Pradesh suffered political crisis between April 2016 and December 2016. The Indian National Congress Chief Minister Nabam Tuki replaced Jarbom Gamlin as the Chief Minister of Arunachal Pradesh on 1 November 2011 and continued until January 2016. After a political crisis in 2016, President's rule was imposed ending his tenure as the chief minister. In February 2016, Kalikho Pul became the Chief Minister when 14 disqualified MLAs were reinstated by the Supreme Court. On 13 July 2016, the Supreme Court quashed the Arunachal Pradesh Governor J.P. Rajkhowa's order to advance the Assembly session from 14 January 2016 to 16 December 2015, which resulted in President's rule in Arunachal Pradesh. As a result, Nabam Tuki was reinstated as the Chief Minister of Arunachal Pradesh on 13 July 2016. But hours before floor test, he resigned as the chief minister on 16 July 2016. He was succeeded by Pema Khandu as the INC Chief Minister who later joined PPA in September 2016 along with majority of MLAs. Pema Khandu further joined BJP in December 2016 along with majority of MLAs. Arunachal Pradesh becomes 2nd NE state to achieve ODF status.

Geography 

Nyegi Kangsang, the main Gorichen peak, and the Eastern Gorichen peak are other tall Himalaya peaks. The state's mountain ranges, in the extreme East of India, are described as "the place where the sun rises" in historical Indian texts and named the Aruna Mountains, which inspired the name of the state. The villages of Dong (more accessible by car, and with a lookout favoured by tourists) and Vijaynagar (on the edge of Myanmar) receive the first sunlight in all of India.

Major rivers of Arunachal Pradesh include the Kameng, Subansiri, Siang (Brahmaputra), Dibang, Lohit and Noa Dihing rivers. Subsurface flows and summer snow melt contribute to the volume of water. Mountains until the Siang river are classified as the Eastern Himalayas. Those between the Siang and Noa Dihing are classified as the Mishmi Hills that may be part of the Hengduan Mountains. Mountains south of the Noa Dihing in Tirap and Longding districts are part of the Patkai Range.

Climate 
The climate of Arunachal Pradesh varies with elevation. The low-altitude areas have a humid subtropical climate. High-altitude areas (3500–5500 m) have a subtropical highland climate and alpine climate. Arunachal Pradesh receives  of rainfall annually, 70%–80% obtained between May and October.

Biodiversity 

Arunachal Pradesh has among the highest diversity of mammals and birds in India. There are around 750 species of birds and more than 200 species of mammals in the state.
 Arunachal's forests account for one-third of habitat area within the Himalayan biodiversity hot-spot. In 2013,  of Arunachal's forests were identified as part of a vast area of continuous forests (including forests in Myanmar, China and Bhutan) known as Intact forest landscapes. There are three tiger reserves in the state: a reserve in Namdapha National Park, Mouling National Park and Pakke Tiger Reserve.

Flora
It harbours over 5000 plants, about 85 terrestrial mammals, over 500 birds and many butterflies, insects and reptiles. At the lowest elevations, essentially at Arunachal Pradesh's border with Assam, are Brahmaputra Valley semi-evergreen forests. Much of the state, including the Himalayan foothills and the Patkai hills, are home to Eastern Himalayan broadleaf forests. Toward the northern border with Tibet, with increasing elevation, come a mixture of Eastern and Northeastern Himalayan subalpine conifer forests followed by Eastern Himalayan alpine shrub and meadows and ultimately rock and ice on the highest peaks. It supports many medicinal plants and within Ziro valley of Lower Subansiri district 158 medicinal plants are being used by its inhabitants. The mountain slopes and hills are covered with alpine, temperate, and subtropical forests of dwarf rhododendron, oak, pine, maple and fir. The state has Mouling and Namdapha national parks.

Fauna

The major animal species are tiger, leopard, snow leopard, Asian elephant, sambar deer, chital deer, barking deer, sloth bear, mithun (Bos frontalis), gaur, dhole, giant squirrel, marbled cat, leopard cat. A new  subspecies of hoolock gibbon has been described from the state which has been named as the Mishmi Hills hoolock gibbon (H. h. mishmiensis). Three new giant flying squirrels were also described from the state during the last one and half-decade. These were, Mechuka giant flying squirrel, Mishmi Hills giant flying squirrel, and Mebo giant flying squirrel.

Districts 

Arunachal Pradesh comprises two divisions, namely, East and West, each headed by a divisional commissioner and twenty-five districts, each administered by a deputy commissioner. Arunachal Pradesh has a total of 25 districts, West Siang being the largest district in terms of area and Tawang being the smallest district. Papum is the largest district in terms of population and Diwang Valley is the smallest district.

Major towns 

Below are the major towns in Arunachal Pradesh.

Municipal councils 
 Itanagar Municipal Council
 Pasighat Municipal Council

Municipal boards 

 Aalo
 Seppa
 Tezu
 Daporijo
 Namsai
 Ziro
 Roing
 Tawang
 Khonsa
 Bomdila
 Pasighat

Towns 

 Jairampur
 Deomali
 Aalo
 Yingkiong
 Changlang
 Miao
 Basar
 Dirang
 Anini
 Koloriang
 Rupa
 Boleng
 Hawai
 Sagalee
 Yupia
 Doimukh
 Gumto
 Longding
 Pangin
 Likabali
 Malinithan
 Bhalukpong
 Nampong
 Hayuliang
 Palin
 Jamin
 Bhismaknagar
 Akshiganga
 Mechukha
 Pasighat
 Ziro

Economy 

The chart below displays the trend of the gross state domestic product of Arunachal Pradesh at market prices by the Ministry of Statistics and Programme Implementation with figures in billions of Indian Rupees.

Arunachal Pradesh's gross state domestic product was estimated at US$706 million at current prices in 2004 and US$1.75 billion at current prices in 2012. Agriculture primarily drives the economy. Jhum, the local term used for shifting cultivation is being widely practised among the tribal groups, though owing to the gradual growth of other sources of income in the recent years, it is not being practised as prominently as it was earlier. Arunachal Pradesh has close to 61,000 km2 of forests, and forest products are the next most significant sector of the economy. Among the crops grown here are rice, maize, millet, wheat, pulses, sugarcane, ginger, and oilseeds. Arunachal is also ideal for horticulture and fruit orchards. Its major industries are rice mills, fruit preservation and processing units, and handloom handicrafts. Sawmills and plywood trades are prohibited under law. There are many saw mills in the state.

Arunachal Pradesh accounts for a large percentage share of India's untapped hydroelectric potential. In 2008, the government of Arunachal Pradesh signed numerous memorandum of understanding with various companies planning some 42 hydroelectric schemes that will produce electricity in excess of 27,000 MW. Construction of the Upper Siang Hydroelectric Project, which is expected to generate between 10,000 and 12,000 MW, began in April 2009.

Demographics 

Arunachal Pradesh can be roughly divided into a set of semi-distinct cultural spheres, on the basis of tribal identity, language, religion and material culture: the Tibetic-speaking Monpa area bordering Bhutan in the west, the Tani area in the centre of the state, the Mishmi area to the east of the Tani area, the Tai/Singpho/Tangsa area bordering Myanmar, and the Naga area to the south, which also borders Myanmar. In between there are transition zones, such as the Aka/Hruso/Miji/Sherdukpen area, between the Tibetan Buddhist tribes and the animist Tani hill tribes. In addition, there are isolated peoples scattered throughout the state, such as the Sulung.

Within each of these cultural spheres, one finds populations of related tribes speaking related languages and sharing similar traditions. In the Tibetic area, one finds large numbers of Monpa tribespeople, with several subtribes speaking closely related but mutually incomprehensible languages, and also large numbers of Tibetan refugees. Within the Tani area, major tribes include the Nyishi. Apatani also live among the Nyishi, but are distinct. In the centre, one finds predominantly Galo people, with the major sub-groups of Karka, Lodu, Bogum, Lare and Pugo among others, extending to the Ramo and Pailibo areas (which are close in many ways to Galo). In the east, one finds the Adi with many subtribes including Padam, Pasi, Minyong and Bokar, among others. Milang, while also falling within the general Adi sphere, are in many ways quite distinct. Moving east, the Idu, Miju and Digaru make up the Mishmi cultural-linguistic area.

Moving southeast, the Tai Khamti are linguistically distinct from their neighbours and culturally distinct from the majority of other Arunachalese tribes. They follow the Theravada sect of Buddhism.  They also exhibit considerable convergence with the Singpho and Tangsa Naga tribes of the same area, all of which are also found in Burma. They are one of the most recent people group migrated to Arunachal region from Burma. The Nocte Naga and Wancho Naga are another two major ethnic tribes. Both the tribes exhibit very much cultural similarities. Finally, the Deori tribe is also a major community in the state, with their own distinctive identity. They are the descendants of the priestly class of Chutia people who were allowed to continue their livelihood after the defeat of the Chutias. Deoris are one of the only Arunachal tribes in the historical records – which shows they are among the first ethnic groups to inhabit the Himalayas of the districts of Dibang Valley and Lohit, before the arrival of many other tribes in the region between 1600 and 1900.

Literacy has risen in official figures to 66.95% in 2011 from 54.74% in 2001. The literate population is said to number 789,943. The number of literate males is 454,532 (73.69%) and the number of literate females is 335,411 (59.57%).

Religion 

The religious landscape of Arunachal Pradesh is diverse with no single religious group representing the majority of the population. A relatively large percentage of Arunachal's population are nature worshippers (indigenous religions), and follow their own distinct traditional institutions like the Nyedar Namlo by the Nyishi, the Rangfrah by the Tangsa & Nocte, Medar Nelo by the Apatani, the Kargu Gamgi by the Galo and Donyi-Polo Dere by the Adi under the umbrella of the indigenous religion the Donyi-Polo. A small number of Arunachali people have traditionally identified as Hindus, although the number may grow as animist traditions are absorbed into Hinduism. Tibetan Buddhism predominates in the districts of Tawang, West Kameng, and isolated regions adjacent to Tibet. Theravada Buddhism is practised by groups living near the Myanmar border. Around 30% of the population are Christians.

Buddhism arrived in Arunachal Pradesh in 8th century CE from Tibet.

According to the 2011 Indian Census, the religions of Arunachal Pradesh break down as follows:

 Christians: 418,732 (30.26%)
 Hindus: 401,876 (29.04%)
 Others: 362,553 (26.20%)
 Buddhists: 162,815 (11.77%)
 Muslims: 27,045 (1.95%)
 Sikhs: 3,287 (0.24%)
 Jains: 771 (0.06%)
In 1971, the percentage of Christians in the state was 0.79%. This increased to 10.3% by 1991 and by 2011 it had crossed 30%.

Languages 

The speakers of major languages of the state according to the 2011 census are Nyishi (20.74%), Adi (17.35%, includes Adi and Gallong), Nepali (6.89%), Tagin (4.54%), Bhotia (4.51%), Wancho (4.23%), Assamese (3.9%), Bangla (3.65%), Hindi (3.45%), Chakma (3.40%), Apatani (3.21%), Mishmi (3.04%), Tangsa (2.64%), Nocte (2.19%), Bhojpuri (2.04%) and Sadri (1.03%).

The vast majority of Arunachal Pradesh speaks Tani languages of the Sino-Tibetan language family. Tani people are indigenous to central Arunachal Pradesh, including (moving from west to east) the Nyishi, the Apatani, the Tagin, the Galo, the Bokar, the Adi, the Padam, the Pasi, and the Minyong. The Tani languages are noticeably characterised by an overall relative uniformity, suggesting relatively recent origin and dispersal within their present-day area of concentration. Most of the Tani languages are mutually intelligible with at least one other Tani language, meaning that the area constitutes a dialect chain, as was once found in much of Europe; only Apatani and Milang stand out as relatively unusual in the Tani context. Tani languages are among the better-studied languages of the region.

To the east of the Tani area lie three virtually undescribed and highly endangered languages of the "Mishmi" group of Tibeto-Burman: Idu, Digaru and Mishmi people. A number of speakers of these languages are also found in Tibet. The relationships of these languages, both amongst one another and to other area languages, are as yet uncertain. Further south, one finds the Singpho (Kachin) language, which is primarily spoken by large populations in Myanmar's Kachin State, and the Nocte and Wancho languages, which show affiliations to certain Naga languages spoken to the south in modern-day Nagaland.

To the west and north of the Tani area are found at least one and possibly as many as four Bodic languages, including Dakpa and Tshangla language; within modern-day India, these languages go by the cognate but, in usage, distinct designations Monpa and Memba. Most speakers of these languages or closely related Bodic languages are found in neighbouring Bhutan and Tibet, and Monpa and Memba populations remain closely adjacent to these border regions.

Between the Bodic and Tani areas lie many almost completely undescribed and unclassified languages, which, speculatively considered Tibeto-Burman, exhibit many unique structural and lexical properties that probably reflect both a long history in the region and a complex history of language contact with neighbouring populations. Among them are Sherdukpen, Bugun, Hruso, Koro, Miji, Bangru and Puroik/Sulung. The high linguistic significance these languages is belied by the extreme paucity of documentation and description of them, even in view of their highly endangered status. Puroik, in particular, is perhaps one of the most culturally and linguistically unique and significant populations in all of Asia from proto-historical and anthropological-linguistic perspectives, and yet virtually no information of any real reliability regarding their culture or language can be found in print.

Finally, other than the Bodic and Tani groups, there are also certain migratory languages that are largely spoken by migratory and central government employees serving in the state in different departments and institutions in modern-day Arunachal Pradesh. They are classified as Non-Tribal as per the provisions of the Constitution of India.

Outside of Tibeto-Burman, one finds in Arunachal Pradesh a single representative of the Tai family, spoken by Tai Khamti, which is closely affiliated to the Shan language of Myanmar's Shan State. Seemingly, Khampti is a recent arrival in Arunachal Pradesh whose presence dates to 18th and/or early 19th-century migrations from northern Myanmar.

In addition to English, various Indo-Aryan languages Assamese, Bengali, Nepali and especially Hindi are making strong inroads into Arunachal Pradesh. Primarily as a result of the primary education system—in which classes are generally taught by Hindi-speaking migrant teachers from Bihar and other Hindi-speaking parts of northern India, a large and growing section of the population now speaks a semi-creolised variety of Hindi as a mother tongue. Hindi acts as a lingua franca for most of the people in the state. Despite, or perhaps because of, the linguistic diversity of the region, English is the only official language recognised in the state.

Transport

Air 
Itanagar Airport, a Greenfield project serving Itanagar is being constructed at Holongi at a cost of 6.5 billion. Alliance Air operates the only scheduled flights to the state flying from Kolkata via Guwahati to Pasighat Airport. This route commenced in May 2018 under the Government's Regional Connectivity Scheme UDAN following the completion of a passenger terminal at Pasighat Airport in 2017. State-owned Daporijo Airport, Ziro Airport, Along Airport, and Tezu Airport are small and not in operation, but the government has proposed to develop them. Before the state was connected by roads, these airstrips were used to distribute food.

Roads 

The main highway of Arunachal Pradesh is the Trans-Arunachal Highway, National Highway 13 (formerly NH-229 and NH-52). It originates in Tawang and spans most of the width of Arunachal Pradesh, then crosses south into Assam and ends at Wakro. The project was announced by then Prime Minister Manmohan Singh in 2008 for completion by 2015–16, but only became operational in 2018.

NH-15 through Assam follows the southern border of Arunachal Pradesh. Access to central Arunachal Pradesh has been facilitated by the Bogibeel Bridge, an earthquake-resistant rail and road bridge over the Brahmaputra River in Assam, opened for public use on 25 December 2018 by Prime Minister Narendra Modi. A spur highway numbered NH-415 services Itanagar.

State-owned Arunachal Pradesh State Transport Services (APSTS) runs daily bus service from Itanagar to most district headquarters including Tezpur, Guwahati in Assam, Shillong in Meghalaya, and Dimapur in Nagaland.

, every village is connected by road, thanks to funding provided by the central government. Every small town has its own bus station with daily bus service. Connections to Assam have increased commerce.

In 2014, two additional east–west highways were proposed: an Industrial Corridor Highway in the lower foothills, and a Frontier Highway along the McMahon Line. The proposed alignment of the Frontier Highway has been published.

Railway 
Arunachal Pradesh got its first railway line in late 2013 with the opening of the new link line from Harmuti on the main Rangpara North–Murkongselak railway line to Naharlagun in Arunachal Pradesh. The construction of the 33-kilometre  broad-gauge railway line was completed in 2012, and the link became operational after the gauge conversion of the main line from Assam. The state capital Itanagar was added to the Indian railway map on 12 April 2014 via the newly built 20-kilometre Harmuti-Naharlagun railway line, when a train from Dekargaon in Assam reached Naharlagun railway station, 10 kilometres from the centre of Itanagar, a total distance of 181 kilometres.

On 20 February 2015 the first through train was run from New Delhi to Naharlagun, flagged off from the capital by the Indian prime minister, Narendra Modi. India plans to eventually extend the railway to Tawang, near the border with China.

Education 

The state government is expanding the relatively underdeveloped education system with the assistance of NGOs like Vivekananda Kendra, leading to a sharp improvement in the state's literacy rate. The main universities are the Rajiv Gandhi University (formerly known as Arunachal University), under which come 36 institutions offering regular undergraduate courses as well as teacher education and health sciences and nursing degrees, both under governmental and private managements, Indira Gandhi Technological and Medical Sciences University and Himalayan University as well. The first college, Jawaharlal Nehru College, Pasighat, was established in 1964. The First Technical University is Established in 2014 namely North East Frontier Technical University (NEFTU). In Aalo, West Siang District by The Automobile Society India, New Delhi. There is also a deemed university, the North Eastern Regional Institute of Science and Technology as well as the National Institute of Technology, Arunachal Pradesh, established on 18 August 2010, is located in Yupia (headquarter of Itanagar). NERIST plays an important role in technical and management higher education. The directorate of technical education conducts examinations yearly so that students who qualify can continue on to higher studies in other states.

Of the above institutions, only the following institutions are accredited by NAAC (National Assessment and Accreditation Council), in the order of their grade: Jawaharlal Nehru College, Pasighat (Grade A), St Claret College, Ziro (Grade A), Indira Gandhi Govt. College, Tezu (Grade B++), Rajiv Gandhi University (Grade B), National Institute of Technology, Arunachal Pradesh (Grade B), Dera Natung Government College, Itanagar (Grade B), Govt. College, Bomdila (Grade B), Donyi Polo Govt. College, Kamki (Grade B), and Rang Frah Govt. College, Changeling (Grade C).

There are also trust institutes, like Pali Vidyapith, run by Buddhists. They teach Pali and Khamti scripts in addition to typical education subjects. Khamti is the only tribe in Arunachal Pradesh that has its own script. Libraries of scriptures are in a number of places in Lohit district, the largest one being in Chowkham.

The state has two polytechnic institutes: Rajiv Gandhi Government Polytechnic in Itanagar established in 2002 and Tomi Polytechnic College in Basar established in 2006. There are two law colleges, namely, the private-owned Arunachal Law Academy at Itanagar and the government-owned Jarbom Gamlin Government Law College at Jote, Itanagar. The College of Horticulture and Forestry is affiliated to the Central Agricultural University, Imphal.

State symbols

See also 

 Cuisine of Arunachal Pradesh
 Arunachal Scouts
 Arunachal Pradesh Police
 Arunachal Frontier Highway
 List of institutions of higher education in Arunachal Pradesh
 List of people from Arunachal Pradesh
 Ministry for Development of North Eastern Region
 Religion in Arunachal Pradesh
 Sino-Indian border dispute
 2014 Arunachal Pradesh Legislative Assembly election
 2009 Arunachal Pradesh Legislative Assembly election
 South Tibet

References

Bibliography

External links

Government
 Official Site of the government of Arunachal Pradesh
 Official Tourism Site of Arunachal Pradesh, India

General information
  
 

 
Northeast India
States and union territories of India
English-speaking countries and territories
Territorial disputes of China
Territorial disputes of India
Tibet
States and territories established in 1987
1987 establishments in India